Interlude is the fifth studio album by the American hip hop artist Kool Moe Dee. It was released in 1994 via his Treacherous Three bandmate DJ Easy Lee's Wrap Records, with distribution by Ichiban Records. Alongside Kool Moe Dee, audio production was handled by Scratch God and the Fearless Four members DLB & Master O.C.

The album failed to regain Kool Moe Dee much of the success and popularity he had in the mid-1980s. It is his last studio album to date.

Critical reception
The Daily Press wrote that the beats, "while competent by the standards of a few years ago, sound flat compared to the innovations of Dr. Dre." The Spin Alternative Record Guide thought that "Kool Moe Dee and his crew stand firm in their classicism." This Reached 64 on the R&B  Charts

Track listing

Personnel
Mohandes Dewese – vocals, producer (tracks: 6, 12)
Eyon C. Mason – vocals (track 6)
John Otto – guitar, bass, artwork
Ahmad Wyatt – keyboards & scratches (tracks: 1–5, 7, 9–11), producer (tracks: 2–5, 7–11)
Oscar Rodriguez, Jr. – producer (tracks: 2–5, 7–11)
Darryll LeRoy Barksdale – producer (tracks: 2–3, 5, 7–11)
Tamara Rafkin – artwork

References

1994 albums
Kool Moe Dee albums
Ichiban Records albums